Bhushan Kumar Dua (born 27 November 1977) is an Indian film producer and music producer. He is the chairman and managing director of Super Cassettes Industries Limited, also known as T-Series. He is known for his work in Bollywood.

As per Hurun 2022 Rich list, he was ranked as 175th richest Indian with a net worth of 1000 crores INR (around 700 Million USD)

Career
Kumar took control of the music company T-Series in 1998, along with his uncle Krishan Kuamar, after the murder of his father, Gulshan Kumar. He went on to become the chairman and managing director of the company.

As managing director, Kumar diversified the company's business into electronics, CDs, audio/video tapes and cassettes and film production. For this and for popularising Indian music overseas, he was honoured by the Government of India's Electronics and Software Export Promotion Council.

Film producer
After firming his company's presence in the music market, Kumar ventured into making films. Kumar has made financially successful films such as Tum Bin, Bhool Bhulaiyaa, Patiala House, Ready and Lucky: No Time for Love. 

Kumar donned the producer's cap in 2001 for Tum Bin, a film that ran successfully and marked the debut of the lead star cast along with the film's director Anubhav Sinha.

In 2013, Kumar produced Nautanki Saala. The same year, Bushan Kumar released a remake of Aashiqui, Aashiqui 2. Aashiqui 2 proved to be a turning point for Bhushan's production house as it was considered to be one of the Super Hits of 2013.

Kumar's subsequent projects included such films as Yaariyan, a youth-based film helmed by his wife Divya Khosla Kumar. In 2014,  Kumar revived B.R. Chopra Films with Bhoothnath Returns. He then entered the genre of horror thriller with Creature 3D, starring Bipasha Basu and Imran Abbas and directed by Vikram Bhatt.

T-Series has worked with directors such as Madhur Bhandarkar, Milan Luthria, Anurag Basu and Mohit Suri.

On 3 April 2017, Kumar signed a contract with Akshay Kumar for the film Mogul, which is an official biopic based on the life of his father. However, Akshay Kumar quit the film and Aamir Khan agreed to do the part, only to quit and return later.

Personal life
Bhushan Kumar was born in a Punjabi family in Delhi to the founder of T-Series, owner Gulshan Kumar and his wife Sudesh Kumari Dua. Kumar married Divya Khosla on 13 February 2005 at the Maa Vaishno Devi shrine in Katra. They have a son born in October 2011.

Controversies
In June 2018, Bhushan Kumar was accused of sexual harassment by Marina Kuwar.

In December 2018, Kumar was accused by the income tax department of evading taxes and of moving hundreds of crores to foreign countries to purchase properties using benami means.

Filmography

Awards and nominations

Filmfare Awards

References

External links

 
 

Film producers from Delhi
Living people
1977 births
Hindi film producers
Indian record producers
Punjabi Hindus